Jean Marie Octave Géraud Poueigh (24 February 1876 in Toulouse – 14 October 1958 in Olivet) was a French composer, musicologist, music critic, and folklorist. He wrote music criticism under the pseudonym Octave Séré. Poueigh is known for suing fellow French composer Erik Satie over an insulting postcard.

Biography 
A student at the Schola Cantorum of Paris, Jean Poeigh is the author of works of chamber music, vocal or instrumental, a sonata for violin ..., lyrical works: Perkain, opera based on a Basque legend by Pierre Harispe, libretto Pierre-Barthélemy Gheusi, presented at the Bordeaux opera 16 January 1931, sets and costumes by Ramiro Arrue), le Roi de Camargue (performed in Marseille 21 May 1948).

At the same time, he wrote much as a musical critic in the Ère nouvelle. After the performance of the ballet Parade (1917), he wrote a virulent criticism and Érik Satie sent him some incendiary letters, the most famous being thus written: "Monsieur and dear friend, you are only an arse, worse, an arse without music". This being sent on a postcard without envelope, so likely to have been read by the concierge, Satie fell short of a one-year sentence for public defamation. At the trial Jean Cocteau was arrested and beaten by police for repeatedly yelling "arse" in the courtroom. Satie was given a sentence of eight days in jail. Satie was forced to pay a fine but on appeal his prison sentence was suspended and ultimately vacated. See Volta, "Satie Seen Through His Letters",

Pouegh was interested in traditional music, collecting songs from the Basque Country and Occitania and beyond, and all the folklore of these regions on which his works are still authoritative.

Musical works 
Pointes sèches
Nocturnes
Les lointains (1903)
Suite Fünn
Marche triomphale
Rhapsodie des Pyrénées (1925)
Suite montagnarde (1926)
Le Meneur de Loups (1921), opera
Perkain (1932) opera
 (film 1942)
Le Roi de Camargue (1948), opera
Bois-Brûlé (1956) opera
Frivolant (1922), ballet

Literary works 
1921: Musiciens français d'aujourd'hui (under the pseudonym Octave Séré), Paris, Mercure de France
1926: Chansons populaires des Pyrénées françaises, traditions, mœurs, usages, Paris
1951: Chants de Béarn et de Gascogne, in collaboration with Simin Palay
1952: Le folklore des pays d’oc : la tradition occitane, Paris, Payot
1954: De la musique chez les Basques : leurs chants et leurs danses populaires, VIIIe Congrès d'études basques, Bayonne, Ustaritz

References

External links 
 Jean Poueigh : Air à Danser on YouTube
 
 Jean Poueigh on Média 19
 Jean Poueigh (1876-1958) on CIRIEF
 Musiciens français d'aujourd'hui; notices biographiques, suivies d'un essai de bibliographie et accompagnées d'un autographe musical on archive.org

1876 births
Musicians from Toulouse
1958 deaths
20th-century French composers
French male composers
20th-century French musicologists
French folklorists
20th-century French journalists
20th-century French male musicians